The voiced alveolar nasal is a type of consonantal sound used in numerous spoken languages.

The vast majority of languages have either an alveolar or dental nasal. There are a few languages that lack either sound but have , such as Yoruba, Palauan, and colloquial Samoan (however, these languages all have . There are some languages (e.g.

True dental consonants are relatively uncommon. In the Romance, Dravidian, and Australian languages, n is often called "dental" in the literature. However, the rearmost contact, which gives a consonant its distinctive sound, is actually alveolar or denti-alveolar. The difference between the Romance languages and English is not so much where the tongue contacts the roof of the mouth but the part of the tongue that makes contact. In English, it is the tip of the tongue (such sounds are termed apical), but in the Romance languages, it is the flat of the tongue just above the tip (such sounds are called laminal).

However, there are languages with true apical (or less commonly laminal) dental n. It is found in the Mapuche language of South America, where it is actually interdental. A true dental generally occurs allophonically before  in the languages that have it, as in English tenth. Similarly, a denti-alveolar allophone occurs in languages that have denti-alveolar stops, as in Spanish cinta.

Some languages contrast laminal denti-alveolar and apical alveolar nasals. For example, in the Malayalam pronunciation of Nārāyanan, the first n is dental, the second is retroflex, and the third alveolar.

A postalveolar nasal occurs in a number of Australian Aboriginal languages, including Djeebbana and Jingulu.

Features

Features of the voiced alveolar nasal:

 There are four specific variants of :
 Dental, which means it is articulated with either the tip or the blade of the tongue at the upper teeth, termed respectively apical and laminal.
 Denti-alveolar, which means it is articulated with the blade of the tongue at the alveolar ridge, and the tip of the tongue behind upper teeth.
 Alveolar, which means it is articulated with either the tip or the blade of the tongue at the alveolar ridge, termed respectively apical and laminal.
 Postalveolar, which means it is articulated with either the tip or the blade of the tongue behind the alveolar ridge, termed respectively apical and laminal.

Occurrence

Dental or denti-alveolar

Alveolar

Postalveolar

Variable

See also
 Index of phonetics articles

Notes

References

External links
 

Alveolar consonants
Dental consonants
Postalveolar consonants
Nasal consonants
Pulmonic consonants
Voiced consonants